Century City is a 176-acre (71.2 ha) neighborhood and business district in Los Angeles, California. Located on the Westside to the south of Santa Monica Boulevard around 10 miles (16 km) west of Downtown Los Angeles, Century City is one of the most prominent employment centers in the Los Angeles metropolitan area, and its skyscrapers form a distinctive skyline on the Westside.

The district was developed on the former backlot of film studio 20th Century Studios, and its first building was opened in 1963. Important to the economy are the Westfield Century City shopping center, business towers, and the Fox Studio Lot.

History

The land of Century City belonged to cowboy actor Tom Mix (1880-1940), who used it as a ranch. It later became a backlot of 20th Century Fox, which still has its headquarters just to the southwest. The area is named for the 20th Century Fox's Century Property.

In 1956, Spyros Skouras (1893-1971), who served as the President of 20th Century Fox from 1942 until 1962, and his nephew-in-law Edmond Herrscher (died 1983), an attorney sometimes known as "the father of Century City", decided to repurpose the land for real estate development. The following year, in 1957, they commissioned a master-plan development from Welton Becket Associates, which was unveiled at a major press event on the "western" backlot later that year.

Herrscher had encouraged his uncle-in-law to borrow money instead, but once Skouras refused, he was out of the picture.

The new owners conceived Century City as "a city within a city". In 1963, the first building, Gateway West Building, was completed. The next year, in 1964, Minoru Yamasaki designed the Century Plaza Hotel. Five years later, in 1969, architects Anthony J. Lumsden and César Pelli designed the Century City Medical Plaza.

Geography

City Planning Department
According to the City of Los Angeles Department of City Planning, Century City constitutes census tract 2679.01.

As shown on the map published on the Century City Chamber of Commerce website, Century City is generally bounded by Santa Monica Boulevard to the north, the city of Beverly Hills to the east, Pico Boulevard to the south, and Century Park West to the west (including the west side of Century Park West between Santa Monica Boulevard and Constellation Boulevard). These boundaries correspond with those recognized by the Century City Business Improvement District Association.

Neighboring Century City are Beverly Hills to the east, Cheviot Hills to the south, West Los Angeles to the west, and Westwood to the north.

Mapping L.A.
The Mapping L.A. project of the Los Angeles Times extends Century City's western boundary to Beverly Glen Boulevard. However, this more expansive definition is not consistent with other L.A. Times reports: a 1999 article sets Century Park West as Century City's western boundary, and a 2017 article refers to the neighborhood to the west of Century City (between Century Park West and Beverly Glen Boulevard) as distinct from it.

Climate

Demographics

Century City makes up census tract 2679.01, which is 0.4 square miles. The 2000 U.S. Census counted 2,428 residents and 1,812 housing units, for an average of 1.34 persons per household.

The 2017 American Community Survey estimated a population of 2,235 in Century City, or 5,170.1 people per square mile, and 1,929 housing units. Per capita income was $148,638 and median household income was $123,889.

Mapping L.A. data
The following data apply to Century City within the boundaries set by Mapping L.A.:

In 2008, the median age for residents was 46, older than average for the city and the county. The percentage of residents aged 65 and older (26.4%) was the highest for any neighborhood in Los Angeles County. The percentages of widowed men and women and of divorced men were among the county's highest. Military veterans accounted for 11.9% of the population, a high rate for the city and the county.

The neighborhood was considered "not especially diverse" ethnically, with a high percentage of white residents. The breakdown was whites, 82.5%; Asians, 8.6%; Latinos, 4.4%; blacks, 1.4%; and others, 3,0%. Iran (21.2%) and Canada (6.1%) were the most common places of birth for the 25.5% of the residents who were born abroad—a low percentage, compared to the city at large.

The median yearly income in 2014 was $95,135, a high figure for Los Angeles. The percentage of households that earned $125,000 and up was high for Los Angeles County. The average household size of 1.8 people was low for Los Angeles. Renters occupied 39.6% of the housing stock and apartment owners held 60.4%.

Economy

Westfield Century City and Fox Studios occupy important acreage in the neighborhood. Westfield Century City underwent an $800 million renovation and expansion aiming to maintain the center's status as one of the Westside's premier shopping and entertainment destinations.

One tower, Constellation Place (formerly the MGM Tower), has the headquarters of Houlihan Lokey, ICM Partners, and International Lease Finance Corporation. Crystal Cruises is also headquartered in Century City along with haircare manufacturer, John Paul Mitchell Systems.

Government and infrastructure

The Los Angeles County Department of Health Services SPA 5 West Area Health Office serves Century City.

Los Angeles Fire Department Station 92 is the assigned fire station for the district. The Los Angeles Police Department operates the  West Los Angeles Community Police Station at 1663 Butler Avenue, 90025, serving the neighborhood.

Santa Monica Airport is nearby. Major roads including Santa Monica Boulevard, Pico Boulevard, the Santa Monica Freeway (I-10), and the San Diego Freeway (I-405) are all located next to Century City. Olympic Boulevard goes through Century City.

Phase II of the Purple Line Extension, set to open in 2025, will add a subway stop (Century City/Constellation) on the D Line at the intersection of Avenue of the Stars and Constellation Boulevard, in the heart of Century City.

Education

Fifty-five percent of Century City residents aged 25 or over had earned a four-year degree by 2000, a high figure for Los Angeles.

Los Angeles Unified School District is the school district of Century City.

Three private schools are located in or near Century City  — VINCI Academy Daycare & Preschool, at 1940 Century Park East; Lycée Français de Los Angeles, at 10361 Pico Boulevard; and Temple Isaiah Preschool and Kindergarten, at 10345 West PIco Boulevard.

Gallery

See also

 1967 Century City demonstration

References

External links

 History of the Century Plaza Hotel 
 Century City Film Festival

 
Neighborhoods in Los Angeles
Westside (Los Angeles County)
West Los Angeles
1961 establishments in California
Populated places established in 1961
Welton Becket buildings
Articles containing video clips
Edge cities in Greater Los Angeles